Menegazzia chrysogaster is a species of foliose lichen from South America. It was described as new to science in 2001.

See also
List of Menegazzia species

References

chrysogaster
Lichen species
Lichens described in 2001
Lichens of South America
Taxa named by Arve Elvebakk